Krasny Voskhod is a rural locality (a selo) in Krasnoarmeysky Selsoviet, Kizlyarsky District, Republic of Dagestan, Russia. The population was 1,684 as of 2010. There are 23 streets.

Geography 
Krasny Voskhod is located 4 km northwest of Kizlyar (the district's administrative centre) by road. Imeni Zhdanova and Imeni Kirova are the nearest rural localities.

Nationalities 
Avars, Russians, Laks, Tsakhurs, Dargins and Rutuls live there.

References 

Rural localities in Kizlyarsky District